The Google News Lab is a global team at Google whose mission is to "collaborate with journalists and entrepreneurs to help build the future of media". Launched in 2015, the team works with news organizations to help drive innovation, address industry challenges, and provide training and access to emerging technologies for reporting and storytelling. Some industry commentators have labelled it as an attempt to build goodwill among journalists, in contrast with rival tech giants such as Facebook.

The Google News Lab was added to Google News Initiative when it launched in 2018.

Impact

Combating misinformation 
Google News Lab was a founding partner of the fact-checking coalition First Draft, which launched in 2015. In 2017, Google helped First Draft launch new collaborative reporting models to verify news stories during the UK, French and German elections.

The News Lab also provides free training for journalists in how to "discover and debunk false news and misinformation," both in-person and on its training website.

Newsroom diversity 
In 2017, the Google News Lab partnered with the American Society of News Editors (ASNE) on its annual Newsroom Employment Diversity Survey. The survey showed how hundreds of newsrooms across the U.S. had changed since 2001. It also compared newsroom diversity counts to census data to show how newsrooms compare to their local area in terms of race and gender.

The Google News Initiative Fellowship offers journalism and technology students from diverse backgrounds the opportunity to spend a summer working at organizations around the world.

Local news 
The News Lab has trained more than 9,000 local reporters in the U.S. through a partnership with the Society for Professional Journalists. Training programs for local newsrooms also exist in Europe, the Asia Pacific, Latin America, the Middle East, and Africa.

Criticism 

Some industry commentators have labelled Google News Lab as an attempt to build goodwill among journalists, in contrast with rival tech giants such as Facebook.

The Google News Lab and Google's Digital News Initiative have been criticized as buy-offs of the newsrooms after its advertising monopoly led to countless layoffs in newsrooms.

See also
 Digital News Initiative, Google's fund for European newsrooms

References

External links
 

News Lab
American journalism organizations